The first legislative council election for the Madras Presidency after the establishment of a bicameral legislature by the Government of India Act of 1935 was held in February 1937. The Indian National Congress obtained a majority by winning 27 out of 46 seats in the Legislative Council for which the elections were held. This was the first electoral victory for the Congress in the presidency since elections were first conducted for the Council in 1920 and C. Rajagopalachari (Rajaji) became the Chief Minister. The Justice Party which had ruled the presidency for most of the previous 17 years was voted out of power. Congress also won the Legislative assembly election held simultaneously.

Government of India Act of 1935
The Government of India Act of 1935 established a bicameral legislature in the Madras province. The legislature consisted of the Governor and two Legislative bodies - a legislative assembly and a legislative council. The legislative council consisted of a minimum of 54 and a maximum of 56 members. It was a permanent body not subject to dissolution by the governor, and one-third of its members retired every three years. 46 of its members were elected directly by the electorate, while the governor could nominate 8 to 10 members. The breakdown of seats in the council was as follows:

The Act provided for a limited adult franchise based on property qualifications. Seven million people, roughly 15% of the Madras people holding land or paying urban taxes were qualified to be the electorate.

Issues and campaign

The Justice Party had been in power in Madras for 17 years since 1920. Its hold on power was briefly interrupted only once in 1926-28 when P. Subbarayan was a non-affiliated Chief Minister.

Unpopularity of the Justice Government
The Justice Government under the Raja of Bobbili had been steadily losing ground since the early 1930s. It was beset with factional politics and its popularity was eroding slowly due to the autocratic rule of Bobbili Raja. The Raja was inaccessible to his own party members and tried to destroy the power and influence of the District level leaders who were instrumental in the party winning power earlier. 
The Suthanthira Sangu, in its issue dated 26 February 1935 explained the destruction of the power of local bodies:

The Justice Party was seen as the collaborative party, agreeing with the British Government's harsh measures. Its economic policies during the Great Depression of the 1930s were also highly unpopular. Its refusal to decrease the land revenue taxation in non-Zamindari areas by 12.5% was hugely unpopular. The Bobbili Raja, himself a Zamindar, cracked down on the Congress protests demanding reduction of the revenue. This further reduced the popularity of the Justice Party. The Governor of Madras, Lord Erskine reported to the then Secretary of State Zetland in February 1937, that the peasants in South India had become fed up with the Justice Party and

The affluent lifestyle led by the Justice ministers at the height of the Great Depression were sharply criticized by the Madras Press. They drew a monthly salary of Rs. 4,333.60 when compared to Rs. 2,250 per month the ministers in the Central Provinces received. This invoked the ire of the Madras press. The newspaper India wrote:

Even the European owned newspaper The Madras Mail which had been the champion of the earlier Justice Governments was sickened by the ineptitude and patronage policies of the Bobbili Raja administration. On 1 July 1935, it wrote in its editorial:

The extent of the discontent against the Justice Government is reflected in an article of Zamin Ryot:

Resurgence of the Congress
The Swaraj Party which had been the Justice party's main opposition merged with the Indian National Congress in 1935 when the Congress decided to participate in the electoral process. The Madras Province Congress party was led by S. Satyamurti and was greatly rejuvenated by its successful organisation of the Salt Satyagraha and Civil Disobedience movement of 1930-31. The Civil Disobedience movement, the Land Tax reduction agitations and Union organizations helped the Congress to mobilize popular opposition to the Bobbili Raja government. The revenue agitations brought the peasants into the Congress fold and the Gandhian hand spinning programme assured the support of weavers. Preferential treatment given to European traders brought the support of the indigenous industrialists and commercial interests. The Congress had effective campaigners like Satyamurti and Rajaji while the Justice party had only Arcot Ramasamy Mudaliar to counter them. The Congress election manifesto was populist in nature and promised to reduce land revenue taxes, to ensure decent working conditions and wages for the laborers, low rents and all around prosperity. It even appealed to the Europeans who had reserved seats in the Assembly. It also appealed to the nationalist sentiment of the populace. Commenting on the Congress's manifesto, the Indian Annual Register said:

The Congress campaign was effective and targeted all sections of the population like peasants, workers, weavers and businessmen. Against it the Justice party had no definite program or policies. It could only harp on the Brahmin domination in Congress. Amidst the backdrop of the Great Depression and economic distress their charge was not effective.

Other parties
The other parties contesting the election were the Madras Province Muslim League (MPML) headed by Jamal Mohammad, the People's Party of Madras started by Raja of Pithapuram (a breakaway faction from the Justice Party) and the Muslim Progressive Party led by Nawab C. Abdul Hakim and S. M. Pasha.

Results
Party wise breakdown of seats: (total number of seats 56; elections held for 46; nominated 10)

Analysis

The victory of Congress over the Justice Party has been ascribed to various reasons. N. Ram, Editor-in-Chief of The Hindu and  Richard L. Hardgrave, Professor Emeritus in the Humanities, Government and Asian Studies at University of Texas, Austin attribute the defeat of the Justice party to its collaboration with the British Government. According to Hardgrave:

David A. Washbrook, senior research fellow of History at Trinity College, Cambridge and Andre Beteille say the elitist nature of the Justice Party members caused its defeat. Marguerite Ross Barnett attributes the Justice party's defeat to two causes - 1) The loss of Dalit and Muslim support and 2) Flight of the social radicals to the Self-Respect Movement. According to P. Rajaraman:

Government formation

The elections were held and the results declared in February 1937. Rajaji was elected as the leader of Congress Legislature Party (CLP) in March 1937. Despite being the majority party in the Assembly and the Council, the Congress was hesitant to form a Government. Their objections stemmed from the special powers given to the Governor by the Government of India Act of 1935. According to the act, the Governor was given 1) special responsibilities in the area of Finance and (2) control and absolute discretionary powers over the cabinet in certain other issues. The Governor had the power to overrule the Cabinet. The Congress refused to accept power (in all the six provinces where they had won) with such caveats. The Governor of Madras, Lord Erskine, decided to form an interim provisional Government with non-members and opposition members of the Legislative Assembly. V. S. Srinivasa Sastri was first offered the Chief Ministership of the interim government but he refused to accept it. Eventually an interim Government was formed with Kurma Venkata Reddy Naidu of the Justice Party as Chief Minister on 1 April 1937. Congress leaders like S. Satyamurti were apprehensive about the decision to not accept power. They carried out a campaign to convince Congress High Command (Mohandas K. Gandhi and Jawaharlal Nehru) to accept power within the limitations set by the Government of India Act. They also appealed to the British Government to give assurances that the Governor's special powers will not be misused. On 22 June, Viceroy Linlithgow issued a statement expressing the British Government's desire to work with the Congress in implementing the 1935 Act. On 1 July, the Congress Working Committee (CWC) agreed to form Governments in the provinces they had won. On 14 July, Rajaji was sworn in as the Chief Minister. The first legislative assembly convened for the first time on 15 July and elected Bulusu Sambamurti and A. Rukmani Lakshmipathi as the Speaker and Deputy Speaker respectively.

Kurma Venkata Reddy Naidu's Cabinet
Council of ministers in K. V. Reddy Naidu's interim provisional cabinet(1 April - 14 July 1937):

Rajagopalachari's Cabinet
Council of Ministers in Rajagopalachari's Cabinet (15 July 1937 – 29 October 1939):

Changes
On 7 January 1939, Raman Menon died and V. J. Varkey was inducted into the cabinet. Education portfolio was transferred from Subbarayan to Varkey and instead Subbarayan was given additional charge of Courts and Prisons.

Impact

The 1937 elections marked the start of the Indian National Congress' participation in the governance of India. In the Madras Presidency, it also marked the beginning of Rajaji's ascendancy in the Congress Legislature Party. Though it was Satyamurti who had led the election campaign, he gave up the leadership of the Legislature to Rajaji in accordance to the wishes of the Congress High Command in Delhi. This election also marked the beginning of Congress dominance in the politics of Madras Presidency and later the Madras State. Except for an interlude during 1939-46, the Congress would go on to rule Madras uninterrupted till 1967. The Justice Party was demoralized by its defeat and the Raja of Bobbili temporarily retired from active politics. The party remained in political wilderness and eventually came under the control of Periyar E. V. Ramasamy in 1938 and transformed into the Dravidar Kazhagam in 1944.

See also
1937 Madras Presidency legislative assembly election

References

Elections in Madras Presidency
1937 elections in India
State Legislative Council elections in India